American Soccer League may refer to:
 American Soccer League (1921–33), from 1921 to 1933
 American Soccer League (1933–83), from 1933 to 1983
 American Soccer League (1988–89), from 1988 to 1989
 American Soccer League (2014–17), from 2014 to 2017